The Honda XR600R is an offroad motorcycle with an air-cooled single cylinder, four-stroke engine. The bike was manufactured by Honda from 1985 to 2000 and is part of the Honda XR series. The currently available road oriented XR650L model is similar to the XR600R  with an engine of more displacement but lower compression and less horsepower. The XR600R was superseded by the XR650R with a 649cc liquid-cooled engine and an aluminum frame.

The engine displacement is 591 cc with four valves placed in a RFVC (Radial Four Valve Combustion) radial disposition with a single camshaft. It has a dry sump lubrication system. The engine has a compression of 9.0:1 with a bore/stroke of 97 × 80 mm.
The engine is fed by a 39 mm piston-valve carburetor.
The front suspension is managed by two conventional cartridge valve 43 mm forks with compression and rebound adjustability, and in the rear is a Prolink single shock with preload, compression and rebound adjustability.
The bike has a five-speed transmission and a kickstarter.

General specifications for the Honda XR600R

References

XR600
Off-road motorcycles
Motorcycles introduced in 1985